Amor Eterno Amor (Love, Eternal Love) is a Brazilian telenovela produced by TV Globo and exhibited in the schedule of 18 hours. Written by Elizabeth Jhin and directed by Roberta Richards, Fábio Strazzer, Luciana Oliveira Paulo Ghelli, Pedro Vasconcelos and Rogério Gomes, it was released on March 5, 2012, ending on September, 7 of the same year, replacing A Vida da Gente.

Plot

At age 10, Carlos fled the interior of Minas Gerais, tired of the abuse of his stepfather Virgílio. Carlos had the special ability to tame animals with a gesture or look, which Virgílio exploited to make money. After running away, alone and lost on the road, the boy met Xavier, a charitable truck driver who took him to the Island of Marajó, in Pará. Carlos became his adopted son.

Years passed. Carlos became an attractive man and competent buffalo herder. Known in the neighborhood by the nickname Barão (Baron), for his intelligence and skill, he catches the eye of Valeria, the daughter of local traders, who refuses to accept that he does not return her affections.

Carlos remains infatuated with the memory of a childhood sweetheart. Before he ran away from home, Carlos fell in love with his neighbor, Elisa. Playing together, they fell into an innocent childhood love and promised to love each other forever and get married one day, when they were grown. But when he ran away they were separated, and so many years passed that even if he were to meet Elisa again he would probably not recognize her.

In the city of Rio de Janeiro, meanwhile, Verbena Borges, a kindly millionaire and widow of one of the biggest businessmen in Rio, even ill and near death, searches for her only son, Rodrigo, who disappeared more than 20 years ago. Verbena never understood whether the boy was kidnapped or ran away, without even suspecting that her former husband, Virgílio, had anything to do with it.

Verbena's sister Melissa does not want Verbena to rediscover the child, for inheritance reasons.
In the search for her heir, Verbena also has the help of the two daughters of her physician, Dr. Gabriel: Clara, a sensitive girl with telepathic powers, and Miriam, a beautiful journalist, who falls in love with Carlos without ever suspecting that he is in fact Rodrigo Borges, Verbena's missing son.

Cast

References

External links 
  
 

2012 telenovelas
TV Globo telenovelas
Brazilian telenovelas
2012 Brazilian television series debuts
2012 Brazilian television series endings
Portuguese-language telenovelas